Nature's Weirdest Events is a 2012 British nature documentary series produced by the BBC and presented by Chris Packham. The show looks at weird events from around the world, with introduced footage typically taken from eyewitnesses before the facts are given. Examples include why some dolphins have taken to breaking people's bones and the case of "spaceballs" in Spain.

The series is broadcast on BBC Two and began in 2012.

Episodes

Series 1

Series 2

Series 3

Series 4

Series 5

Reception 
Series four of the show was given a mediocre review by Sam Wollaston of The Guardian, who was unsure whether the swimming pigs of Pig Beach were surprising, and asked "could it be that, having reached series four, they're running out of Weird Natural Events? A resource running low or, less politely, a barrel being scraped?"

Merchandise

DVD
A single-disc DVD containing the first two episodes of the series was released on 12 March 2012.

References

External links 
 
 Nature's Weirdest Events at BBC Earth
 Nature's Weirdest Events at BBC Earth Asia
 Nature's Weirdest at BBC America
 

2012 British television series debuts
2017 British television series endings
BBC high definition shows
BBC television documentaries
BBC television documentaries about science
Documentary films about nature
English-language television shows